Daniel J. Fridgen (born May 18, 1959) is a Canadian former professional ice hockey forward. He played 13 games in the National Hockey League with the Hartford Whalers between 1982 and 1983. After his playing career Fridgen coached at both Union College and Rensselaer Polytechnic Institute for several years.

Career
Fridgen played four seasons of college hockey with Colgate University, where he still holds the record for most goals in a season (38) and most points in a season (68). Fridgen signed with the Hartford Whalers as a free agent on April 5, 1982. He went on to play 13 regular season games for the Whalers in two seasons, scoring two goals and three assists for five points. He split his time with the American Hockey League's Binghamton Whalers where he spent the entire 1983–84 season. Fridgen's career ended prematurely in August 1984 when he suffered head injuries in a car accident, officially announcing his retirement on November 1, 1984.

Fridgen was the assistant hockey coach at Union College from 1985 to 1989. He became the assistant coach of Rensselaer Polytechnic Institute in 1989 and head coach in 1994, remaining until 2006. Fridgen holds the coaching record for the most wins (211) at RPI.

Fridgen is currently part of PuckAgency.  PuckAgency represents several elite hockey players. His son, Corbin, is a graduate of UVM while his daughter, Callan, is a graduate of SUNY Oneonta.

Career statistics

Regular season and playoffs

College Head Coaching Record

Source:

Awards and honors

ECAC Top 50 in 50 - https://gocolgateraiders.com/news/2011/2/16/MHOCKEY_0216114838.aspx

Colgate University Athletic Hall of Honor - https://gocolgateraiders.com/hof.aspx?hof=198

References

External links

1959 births
Living people
Binghamton Whalers players
Canadian ice hockey forwards
Colgate Raiders men's ice hockey players
Hartford Whalers players
Ice hockey people from Ontario
People from Arnprior, Ontario
RPI Engineers men's ice hockey coaches
Union Dutchmen ice hockey coaches
Undrafted National Hockey League players